Vazhunnor is a 1999 Indian Malayalam-language action thriller film directed by Joshiy and written by Benny P. Nayarambalam. The film stars Suresh Gopi, Samyuktha Varma, Sangeetha, Janardanan and Jagathy Sreekumar. The film was scored by S. P. Venkatesh and songs were composed by Ouseppachan.

Plot

Thevakattill Avarachan is an established businessman in a town in central Travancore. Together with his six sons, he controls all businesses in the town. The family is known for its philanthropic efforts too.

Kuttappai, the protagonist of the story, is the youngest son who acts as the muscle of the family. Kuttappayi falls for the new teacher, Rebecca in the family owned school. After a brief romantic feud, the family arranges the engagement of the pair.

The story tenses as new business group called PK Group come to beat the Thevakattu Family and settle old scores. They are Parakaddan Kochouseph, Andrews and Aloshy. PK Group try everything to beat them. In the end Mathachan loses his leg and Kuruvilla gets killed for marrying someone else other than Kochouseppu's daughter years back. Kuttappai gets revenge by burning their fireworks company and in the end, saving Kochouseppu's daughter.

Cast

Suresh Gopi as Thevakkattu Joseph Abraham aka Kuttappayi
Janardhanan as Thevakkattu Avarachan
N. F. Varghese as Thevakkattu Kuruvilla
Jagathy Sreekumar as Thevakkattu Mathachan
Sreenath as Adv.Thevakkattu Simon
E. A. Rajendran as Dr.Thevakkattu Zachariah
Siddique as Thevakkattu Paulachan
Samyuktha Varma as Rani Kuruvilla aka Ranimol
Sangita as Rebecca
Narendra Prasad as Parakkadan Kochousepp
Sai Kumar as Parakkadan Aloshy
Spadikam George as Parakkadan Andrews
Cochin Haneefa as Vadakethala Sivadas
Jagannatha Varma as Kuriakose, Tony's Father
Krishna as Tony
Srividya as Kochammini
Keerikkadan Jose as Sahadevan
Shammi Thilakan as Chandrashekaran, Police Officer
KPAC Azeez as Kunjachan, Rebecca's Father
Jose Prakash as Bishop
Machan Varghese as Cleetus
Kalabhavan Rahman as Chacko, Kuttappai's Friend
Narayanankutty as Yousuf
M. S. Thripunithura as Head Master Philopose
James as Karyasthan Pillai
Mohan Jose as Keeri
Yamuna as Simon's wife
Chandni Shaju as Alice, Paulachan's Wife
Kaviyoor Renuka as Chechiyamma, Kuruvila's wife
Ponnamma Babu as Mary, Mathachan's Wife
Reena (actress) as Mable, Zachariah's Wife
Irshad as C.I. Stephen
Vijay Menon as Kuttappai's friend (Salim)

Box Office
The film was a huge box office Success and has since earned a cult status within the industry, it further turned out to be one of the highest grossing films of the year.
Suresh Gopi's Portrayal of the Character "Kuttapayi" was widely acknowledged and many including pundits, filmmakers and directors have credited it to be one of the best in his career.

Soundtrack
S. P. Venkatesh composed the film score. The songs were composed by Ouseppachan, for which the lyrics were written by Gireesh Puthenchery.

References

External links
 

1999 films
1990s Malayalam-language films
Indian family films
Indian action thriller films
Films directed by Joshiy
Films scored by Ouseppachan